Magnus Larsson was the defending champion but did not compete that year.

Mark Philippoussis won in the final 6–3, 6–7(5–7), 6–3 against Davide Sanguinetti.

Seeds
A champion seed is indicated in bold text while text in italics indicates the round in which that seed was eliminated. All sixteen seeds received a bye to the second round.

  Pete Sampras (second round)
  Mark Philippoussis (champion)
  Tommy Haas (semifinals)
  Nicolás Lapentti (second round)
  Jan-Michael Gambill (quarterfinals)
  Michael Chang (third round)
  Greg Rusedski (second round)
  Harel Levy (third round)
  Davide Sanguinetti (final)
  Wayne Arthurs (second round)
  Juan Balcells (third round)
  Jason Stoltenberg (quarterfinals)
  Michel Kratochvil (second round)
  Paul Goldstein (third round)
  Hyung-Taik Lee (second round)
  Magnus Gustafsson (third round)

Draw

Finals

Top half

Section 1

Section 2

Bottom half

Section 3

Section 4

External links
 ATP main draw

2001 Singles
2001 ATP Tour